58957: The Bluegrass Guitar Collection is a compilation album by American guitarist Tony Rice, released in 2003. The title is derived from the serial number of a 1935 Martin D-28 guitar previously owned by the seminal bluegrass guitarist Clarence White and now owned by Rice.

Track listing 
 "Tipper" (Tony Rice) – 3:38  
 "Monroe's Hornpipe" (Bill Monroe) – 3:00  
 "Jerusalem Ridge" (Monroe) – 6:36  
 "New Chance Blues" (Norman Blake) – 2:15  
 "Blackberry Blossom" (Traditional) – 2:36  
 "Medley: Fiddler's Dram/Whiskey Before Breakfast" (Traditional) – 4:41  
 "Whitewater" (Béla Fleck) – 3:10  
 "Lost Indian" (Ed Haley) – 3:08  
 "Stoney Point" (Traditional) – 2:45  
 "Misty Morning" (Doyle Lawson) – 3:43  
 "Gold Rush" (Monroe) – 3:02  
 "Foggy Mountain Rock" (Louise Certain, Buck Graves, Gladys Stacey) – 3:53  
 "Stoney Creek" (Jim McReynolds, Jesse McReynolds) – 2:33  
 "Home Sweet Home" (Traditional) – 3:27  
 "Bill Cheatham" (Traditional) – 2:09  
 "Stoney Lonesome" (Monroe) – 2:33  
 "Soldier's Joy" (Traditional) – 1:34  
 "Cheyenne" (Monroe) – 3:30  
 "Big Mon" (Monroe) – 2:52  
 "Birdland Breakdown" (John Reischman) – 3:29  
 "Port Tobacco" (Rice) – 4:44

Personnel
Tony Rice – guitar
Doc Watson – guitar
Sam Bush – mandolin, violin
Norman Blake – guitar, mandolin
Darol Anger – fiddle
Fred Carpenter – fiddle
Vassar Clements – fiddle
J. D. Crowe – banjo
Jerry Douglas – dobro
Béla Fleck – banjo
Stuart Duncan – fiddle
Jimmy Gaudreau – mandolin
David Grisman – mandolin
Bobby Hicks – fiddle
Richard Greene – fiddle
Beryl Marriott – fiddle
Todd Phillips – bass
Wyatt Rice – guitar
Larry Rice – mandolin
Mark Schatz – bass
Doyle Lawson – mandolin
John Reischman – mandolin
Rickie Simpkins – fiddle, bass

References

2003 compilation albums
Tony Rice compilation albums
Rounder Records compilation albums